Sergio Herrera may refer to:
Sergio Herrera (footballer, born 1981), Colombian football striker
Sergio Herrera (footballer, born 1993), Spanish football goalkeeper